Denmark High School is a public high school in Forsyth County, Georgia, United States. It serves grades 9–12 for Forsyth County Schools.

History
The school's groundbreaking was on May 25, 2016 and construction was completed in July 2018. Denmark was opened with the main purpose of relieving overcrowding in South Forsyth High School and West Forsyth High School, current rivals of the school. It is named for the late Leila Daughtry Denmark (1898–2012), one of the first female pediatricians in Georgia, retiring in May 2001 at the age of 103. The school opened with an initial enrollment of 1,300 students, and only served grades 9–11 in its inaugural year. As of the 2021-2022 school year, its enrollment is 2,300 students. It is the largest public high school in Georgia by campus area, with a size of 110 acres. The school was built on the property of Dr. Leila Denmark.

Academics
Denmark High School has been accredited by Cognia since June 2018.

Student Data

During the 2021–22 school year, Denmark had an enrollment of 2,373 students. The student body was 40.9% White, 29.1% Asian, 18.0% Hispanic, 8.8% Black, 2.9% Multiracial, and 0.3% Native American.

References

External links

Public high schools in Georgia (U.S. state)
Schools in Forsyth County, Georgia